Springs Range may refer to:

Sand Springs Range, a short mountain range in western Nevada in the United States
Maverick Springs Range, a mountain range in White Pine County, Nevada
Ely Springs Range, a mountain range in Lincoln County, Nevada
Burnt Springs Range, a mountain range in Lincoln County, Nevada
Hot Springs Range, a mountain range in Humboldt County, Nevada
Fish Springs Range, the location of the Fish Springs National Wildlife Refuge in Utah
Box Springs Mountains, a mountain range in north-west Riverside County, California
Tule Springs Hills, a mountain range in Lincoln County, Nevada

North American Cordillera